Central Plains Metropolitan Region intercity railway system is a network of 14 regional high-speed railways radiating or surrounding the city of Zhengzhou, Henan province, China. It is a plan for the gradual implementation of a regional rail system across the province. The system involves Zhengzhou, Luoyang, Kaifeng, Xinxiang, Jiaozuo, Xuchang, Pingdingshan, Luohe and Jiyuan, it aims to form a convenient, fast, safe and efficient intercity rail transportation network. In September 2009, the National Development and Reform Commission produced the "Central Plains Metropolitan Intercity Rail Transit Network Plan (2009–2020)", calling for the planning and construction of approximately 496 km of the total mileage across the regional high speed transit network. The vision is for greater transport opportunities and ultimately the formation of Zhengzhou as the urban centre, with Luoyang as a secondary urban centre, after connecting the major urban areas in the Central Plains urban agglomeration.

Route planning
Based on "Central Plains Metropolitan Intercity Rail Transit Network Plan (2009–2020)", the Central Plains Metropolitan intercity railway construction includes separate railways Zhengzhou–Jiaozuo, Zhengzhou–Kaifeng, Zhengzhou–Luoyang, Zhengzhou–Xinzheng Airport–Xuchang–Pingdingshan, and Zhengzhou–Xinxiang.

Intercity railway routes

Operational lines
 Zhengzhou–Kaifeng intercity railway
 Zhengzhou–Jiaozuo intercity railway
 Zhengzhou–Xinzheng Airport intercity railway

Lines under construction
 Zhengzhou–Xuchang intercity railway (South extension)
 Zhengzhou–Jiaozuo intercity railway Yuntaishan extension

Short term planning
 Zhengzhou–Luoyang intercity railway
 Zhengzhou–Xinxiang intercity railway
 Zhengzhou–Xuchang intercity railway Xuchang–Pingdingshan extension

Long term planning
 Zhengzhou–Xinxiang intercity railway Xinxiang–Jiaozuo extension
 Jiaozuo–Qinyang–Jiyuan line
 Jiyuan–Jili–Luoyang line
 Luoyang–Yichuan–Ruzhou–Baofeng–Pingdingshan line
 Zhengzhou–Xuchang intercity railway Xuchang–Linying–Luohe extension
 Zhengzhou–Luoyang intercity railway Xingyang–Gongyi–Yanshi branch line

References

High-speed railway lines in China
Rail transport in Henan
Railway lines opened in 2014